Pherenice is a genus of Central African orb-weaver spiders containing the single species, Pherenice tristis. It was first described by Tamerlan Thorell in 1899, and has only been found in Cameroon.

References

Araneidae
Monotypic Araneomorphae genera
Spiders of Africa
Taxa named by Tamerlan Thorell